The Jarchi hammam or Jarchibashi hammam is a historical structure in Isfahan, Iran.The hammam belongs to the safavid era. It is located in the Hakim street.

See also
List of the historical structures in the Isfahan province

References

Buildings and structures in Isfahan

Public baths